Until 1 January 2007 Tørring-Uldum municipality was a municipality (Danish, kommune) in the former Vejle County on the Jutland peninsula in central Denmark.  The municipality covered an area of 189 km², and had a total population of 12,519 (2005).  Its last mayor was Kirsten Terkelsen, a member of the Venstre (Liberal Party) political party. The site of its municipal council was the town of Uldum.  The largest town in the municipality was Tørring.

Tørring-Uldum municipality was, as a result of Kommunalreformen ("The Municipality Reform" of 2007), merged with other municipalities.  Most of Tørring-Uldum was merged with Juelsminde municipality and Hedensted municipality to form a new Hedensted municipality.  This created a municipality with an area of 565 km² and a total population of 56,508 (2005). A smaller portion of Tørring-Uldum, however, was split off and merged into the new Vejle municipality. The new municipalities belong to Region Midtjylland ("Mid-Jutland Region").

References 
 Municipal statistics: NetBorger Kommunefakta, delivered from KMD aka Kommunedata (Municipal Data)
 Municipal mergers and neighbors: Eniro new municipalities map

External links 
  
  

Former municipalities of Denmark